Josina is a feminine given name. Notable people with the name include:

 Josina Elder, member of American R&B and soul quartet For Real
 Josina Machel (1945–1971), Mozambican politician activist
 Josina Z. Machel (born 1976), Mozambican civil rights activist
 Josina Peixoto (1857–1911), 2nd first lady of Brazil
 Josina van Aerssen (1733–1797), Dutch composer and painter
 Josina Walburgis of Löwenstein-Rochefort (1615–1683), sovereign Princess Abbess of Thorn Abbey